Prisca Philip (born 1 March 1968) is a Barbadian sprinter. She competed in the women's 200 metres at the 1992 Summer Olympics.

References

External links
 

1968 births
Living people
Athletes (track and field) at the 1992 Summer Olympics
Barbadian female sprinters
Olympic athletes of Barbados
Place of birth missing (living people)
Olympic female sprinters